The Copa del Generalísimo 1966 Final was the 64th final of the King's Cup. The final was played at Santiago Bernabéu in Madrid, on 29 May 1966, being won by Real Zaragoza CD, who beat Club Atlético de Bilbao 2-0.

Details

References

1966
Copa
Athletic Bilbao matches
Real Zaragoza matches